The 1914 LIHG Championship was the third and last edition of the LIHG Championships. It was held from January 20–22, 1914, in Chamonix, France. Great Britain won the championship, Germany finished second, and France finished third.

The tournament was also known as the 1914 Coupe de Chamonix.

Results

Final Table

References

External links
 Tournament on hockeyarchives.info

LIHG Championship
LIHG
International ice hockey competitions hosted by France
Coupe de Chamonix
January 1914 sports events